Michelle Coy (born 22 November 1971) is a British bobsledder from Bath who competed from 1993 to 2002. She is best known for her third place overall finish in the two-woman event for the 1998-99 Bobsleigh World Cup season.

Coy joined the Royal Air Force in 1990, and started competing in bobsleigh after taking course work from the RAF in the wake of watching the events during the 1992 Winter Olympics in Albertville.

She finished 11th in the two-woman event at the 2002 Winter Olympics in Salt Lake City.

References
2002 bobsleigh two-woman results
British Olympic Association profile
List of two-woman bobsleigh World Cup champions since 1995

1971 births
Sportspeople from Bath, Somerset
Bobsledders at the 2002 Winter Olympics
British female bobsledders
Living people
Royal Air Force airmen
Women in the Royal Air Force
Women's Royal Air Force airwomen
Olympic bobsledders of Great Britain